East Central FC is a Dominica association football club from Castle Bruce, Dominica that currently plays in the Dominica Premier League.

History
The club was founded in 2011 and combines players from the communities of Castle Bruce, Good Hope, Saint Sauveur, and Petite Soufriere. It has never won the Premier League title through the 2021 season.

References

External links
Global Sports Archive profile
Official Facebook

Football clubs in Dominica